Hurricane Mitch may refer to:

 Hurricane Mitch, a catastrophic Category 5 hurricane during the 1998 Atlantic hurricane season that caused more than 11,000 fatalities in Central America. 
 Meteorological history of Hurricane Mitch
 Hurricane Mitch Victims National Monument, a national monument in Nicaragua.